Heydar Aliyev International Airport (IATA: GYD, ICAO: UBBB) is one of the seven international airports serving Azerbaijan. Formerly, it was called Bina International Airport after a suburb of Baku. On 10 March 2004, the airport was renamed after the former president of Azerbaijan, Heydar Aliyev. The airport is 20 kilometers northeast of Azerbaijan capital Baku, connected to the city by a highway. The airport serves as the hub for national carrier Azerbaijan Airlines as well as for Azal Avia Cargo, Buta Airways and Silk Way West Airlines.

Facilities

Terminals 

The airport consists of two passenger terminals, Terminal 1 being the newer one, and two cargo terminals.

Terminal 1
Terminal 1 was commissioned in April 2014. Its total area is 65,000 square meters. The terminal is designed for 6 million passengers per year. It currently serves up to 3 million passengers annually. The total parking area is 20,000 square meters for 600 vehicles. The airport has a wide range of shops, restaurants, cafés, and duty-free stores in both the departures and arrivals areas. Terminal 1 contains five lounges and a spa. Terminal 1 operates jet bridges capable of receiving 12 aircraft simultaneously. Two jet bridges are intended for accommodating the world's largest passenger aircraft, the Airbus A380.

Terminal 1’s four-level engineering concept was developed in 2010 by Arup Group with a tricorn shape and semi-transparent roof. The interior, designed by Turkish company AUTOBAN, has a series of oak-veneer “cocoons”. There is Vanderlande baggage handling system in Terminal 1, as well as L-3 equipment for thorough baggage inspection and scanners designed to obtain a layered image of the internal structure of the object. 30 Schindler escalators and 21 elevators are installed in Terminal 1. Terminal 1 is equipped with a Building Management System (BMS) which is designed to automate processes and operations that are implemented in modern buildings and is the technical basis of the so-called intelligent buildings. Also, Terminal 1 is equipped with a separate system of resource support, such as electricity, lighting, ventilation, heating, air conditioning, water supply, and sewerage.

Terminal 2
Architect Viktor Denisov is the author of the project of Terminal 2, which currently serves both domestic flights (South entrance) and international flights of low-cost airlines (North entrance). The project was awarded the first prize in a competition in 1981 and was implemented in 1989.

Cargo
The cargo terminal was opened on March 23, 2005. Terminal building houses companies such as Silk Way Airlines, Imair Air Company, Euroasian Air Services, Lufthansa Cargo and Panalpina. The terminal claims to be able to serve nine Boeing 747, Antonov An-124 or fifteen Ilyushin Il-76-type aircraft simultaneously.

Runways 

Hotels
Sheraton Baku Airport Hotel with 205 rooms is located on the territory of Heydar Aliyev International Airport.

Passengers with children
International Terminal provides a baby care room, play area as well as diaper changing tables.

Services for passengers with reduced mobility
The airport provides personal assistance to passengers with disabilities, special parking spaces, information desks and check-in counters, 24/7 medical centre service, if necessary, and ambulifts for pickup on board aircraft. Airport staff will escort registered passengers to the lounge and then to the boarding gate.

Airlines and destinations

Passenger

Cargo

Statistics

Ground Transport 
Baku International Airport will be eventually linked by the Baku suburban railway.

Bus and taxi
BakuBus H1 buses run 24 hours a day from 28 May Metro Station to Baku Airport. The traffic interval is 30 minutes in the afternoon and hourly at night. The airport is reached from Baku (and back) by private taxi in about 20 minutes.

Transport and parking
The airport can be reached by car from the capital either on the airport highway via Heydar Aliyev Avenue, or on Zikh highway via Nobel Avenue. Parking is available in lots at each terminal, with a total capacity of 1,600 vehicles.

See also 
 List of airports in Azerbaijan
 Transport in Azerbaijan
 List of the busiest airports in the former USSR

References

External links 

 Heydar Aliyev International Airport official website
 
 
 Heydar Aliyev International Airport Renovation Project

Buildings and structures in Baku
Airports built in the Soviet Union
Airports in Azerbaijan
Transport in Baku
Airports established in 1933
1933 establishments in Azerbaijan